The 2019 CONCACAF Champions League Final was the final round of the 2019 CONCACAF Champions League, the 11th edition of the CONCACAF Champions League under its current name, and overall the 54th edition of the premier football club competition organised by CONCACAF, the regional governing body of North America, Central America and the Caribbean.

The final was contested in two-legged home-and-away format between Mexican teams UANL and Monterrey in a Clásico Regiomontano. The first leg was hosted by UANL at the Estadio Universitario in San Nicolás de los Garza on 23 April 2019, while the second leg was hosted by Monterrey at the Estadio BBVA Bancomer in Guadalupe on 1 May 2019.

Monterrey won the final 2–1 on aggregate for their fourth CONCACAF Champions League title.

Teams
In the following table, final until 2008 were in the CONCACAF Champions' Cup era, since 2009 were in the CONCACAF Champions League era.

This was the eighth all-Mexican final in the eleven editions of the CONCACAF Champions League, and guaranteed that for the fourteenth season in a row the CONCACAF club champions were from Mexico.

Venues

Road to the final

Note: In all results below, the score of the finalist is given first (H: home; A: away).

Format
The final was played in a home-and-away two-legged series, with the team with the better performance in previous rounds (Monterrey) hosting the second leg.

If the aggregate score was tied after the second leg, the away goals rule would not be applied, and extra time would be played. If the aggregate score was still tied after extra time, a penalty shoot-out would be used to determine the winner (Regulations II, Article G).

Performance ranking

Matches

First leg

Second leg

References

External links
 

2019
Final
April 2019 sports events in Mexico
May 2019 sports events in Mexico
C.F. Monterrey matches
Tigres UANL matches
2018–19 in Mexican football
International club association football competitions hosted by Mexico